Girls with Balls is a 2018 French-Belgian dark comedy horror film directed by Olivier Afonso and written by Olivier Afonso and Jean-Luc Cano.

Plot
The film follows the Falcons, a championship volleyball team, which follow a detour home through remote, unknown roads. They come across a bar, where they are challenged with a most dangerous game.

Cast
Guillaume Canet
Denis Lavant as Barman
Dany Verissimo-Petit as Dany
Tiphaine Daviot as Jeanne
Manon Azem as Morgane
Camille Razat as Lise
Orelsan as Cow-Boy
Anne-Solenne Hatte as Hazuki
Tony Corvillo as Borgne
Louise Blachère as M.A.
Victor Artus Solaro as Coach (as Artus)
Alex Moreu Garriga as Moustachu
Mathieu Madenian
Margot Dufrene as Tatiana

Reception
The site's consensus states: "While occasionally funny and relentlessly gory, Girls With Balls is neither particularly strong on cheap thrills nor a very remarkable entry to the trash horror genre."

Scott Tobias of Variety wrote "Afonso doesn't push the cartoonish allure far enough into shocks or titillation, and he's not inventive enough to make up for the absence of cheap thrills".

Writing for The Hollywood Reporter, Jordan Mintzer commented "Girls with Balls scores some points for its Z-movie conceits but could have benefited from stronger writing and direction".

According to Kimber Myers of the Los Angeles Times, "This is a deranged nightmare of wildness, as full of laughs as it is arterial sprays".

References

External links

French comedy films
Belgian comedy films
French-language Netflix original films
2018 drama films
2010s French-language films
French-language Belgian films
2010s French films